Norrie's Law hoard is a sixth century silver hoard discovered in 1819 at a small mound in Largo, Fife, Scotland.  Found by an unknown person or persons, most of the hoard was illegally sold or given away. Remaining items of the hoard were found later at the mound, and were turned over to the landowner, General Philip Durham. The surviving 170-piece hoard now is in the National Museum of Scotland. The treasure consists mostly of hacksilver and includes four complete silver pieces.

Description

Norrie's Law hoard is one of the largest Pictish hoards ever to be found. The hoard originally contained  of late Roman and Pictish silver. Consisting of 170 pieces of primarily hacksilver, the treasure also contains complete silver metalwork, including a penanular brooch, a leaf-shaped oval plaque with Pictish symbols, a large hand-pin, and a worn spiral finger-ring. Incomplete items include part of a Roman spoon, pieces of silver sheet from a plate and incomplete spiral bracelets. The hoard's pieces of cut and folded silver were used for their silver bullion value and were often traded or recycled into new objects. The hoard also contained two Late Roman coins which were melted down and sold soon after the initial discovery.

History
The hoard was found in 1819 by an unknown discoverer or discoverers at a small tumulus known as Norrie's Law, which is located on the Largo Estate in Fife. The mound was built of stones and sat on an elevated bank of sand and gravel. The discovery occurred while the anonymous finder(s) were digging sand at the base of the mound. The silver found at the site was given to a peddler who later sold most of the items as scrap silver to be melted down. Some of the items were given away.

The landowner, General Durham, learned of the hoard after most of the silver had been sold off. He was able to locate the remaining items of the hoard that had not been uncovered in the first excavation. Durham kept the discovery of the treasure secret for 20 years. In 1839 a local antiquarian, George Buist, investigated local accounts of the hoard and published an account of the discovery for the local archaeological society. Buist had pewter copies made of two objects from the hoard, the decorated plaque and the large hand-pin. General Durham died in 1845 without descendants. The Largo estate passed to Lilas Dundas Calderwood Durham (Mrs Robert Dundas of Arniston), who donated most of the surviving hoard pieces to the Museum of Society of Antiquaries of Scotland, now the National Museum of Scotland, in 1864. The remainder of the hoard was donated to the museum by her heir, Robert Dundas of Arniston, in 1883.

The fourth century Roman coins from the hoard suggest that it must have been buried sometime after the early fifth century AD. More recent research conducted by the Glenmorangie Research Project at the National Museum of Scotland date the hoard to the sixth century AD. The study also determined that two silver copies of the hoard items were made around 1839. The silver copies of the Pictish-decorated plaque and large hand-pin, were believed until recently to be original early medieval metalwork.

See also

St Ninian's Isle Treasure
 Whitecleuch Chain
Traprain Law treasure
List of hoards in Great Britain

References

Further reading
James Graham-Campbell: Pictish Silver: Status and Symbol. In: H. M. Chadwick Memorial Lectures 13. Cambridge 2002.
George Henderson: The Art of the Picts: Sculpture and Metalwork in Early Medieval Scotland, Thames & Hudson, 2011

External links
 National Museum of Scotland video on the hoard
Glemorangie Research Project

Hoards of jewellery
Celtic archaeological artifacts
Treasure troves in Scotland
Picts
7th century in Scotland
Collections of the National Museums of Scotland